Snibston Colliery Ground was a cricket ground in Coalville, Leicestershire. The land for the cricket ground was originally set aside for the miners at Snibston Colliery. Snibston Colliery was used as an outground by Leicestershire following the Second World War, with the county first playing there against Glamorgan in 1957 County Championship. Leicestershire player there intermittently until 1982, playing eight first-class matches there, plus a single List A one-day match against Glamorgan in the 1970 John Player League. The loss of first-class cricket at Snibston Colliery coincided with a downturn in fortune of the colliery. Snibston Grange Cricket Club continued to play at and maintain the ground, with Coalville Town F.C. moving to part of the ground in 1995 and establishing their Owen Street Sports Ground there. The cricket club folded in 2013, leaving Coalville Town F.C. as the sole tenant of the site.

First-class records
 Highest team total: 387 for 7 declared by Nottinghamshire v Leicestershire, 1959
 Lowest team total: 65 all out by Worcestershire v Leicestershire, 1961
 Highest individual innings: 150* by Jimmy Gray for Hampshire v Leicestershire, 1960
 Best bowling in an innings: 8–70 by Geoff Miller for Leicestershire v Derbyshire, 1982
 Best bowling in a match: 12–138 by Geoff Miller, as above

See also
List of Leicestershire County Cricket Club grounds
List of cricket grounds in England and Wales

References

Coalville
Defunct cricket grounds in England
Leicestershire County Cricket Club